Romina Malaspina (born on 7 July 1994 in Mar del Plata, Argentina) is an Argentine model, television personality, reality star, showgirl, dancer, singer, social media influencer, television host, businesswoman, disc-jockey and actress.

Biography

Career 
She started her career on television in 2015 as reality star (competitor) in the Argentine Gran Hermano and appeared on others reality show like the Chilean Doble Tentación in 2017 and the Spanish Supervivientes in 2018. She posed for the Cover of Playboy Argentina in November 2015 and she took part in 2016 as a guest star and commentator in Morfi, todos a la mesa and La jaula de la moda, two Argentine television magazines. She took part, as dancer of reggaeton, in the Argentine music video Más que amigos of J One published in July 2016. She took part in 2018, as vedette and actress, in Magnífica, an Argentine theater play, and in the same year, after her participation in Telecinco's Supervivientes, she was also a guest star and commentator in Volverte a ver, a Spanish television magazine. During the years she works also as model and social media influencer.

Under the pseudonym of Ru$$ha she took part in the Argentine music video, published in March 2020, Hustler Lady as main singer, dancer and showgirl: this music video is her first song. She was part of the confirmed cast of the Argentine talent show Bailando 2020 in April–May as celebrity dancer contestant, but due to the COVID-19 pandemic this edition of Marcelo Tinelli's dance program Bailando por un Sueño was deleted before the beginning; since June 2020 she hosts, with various partners, two news programs (Noticias de 22 a 00 and Fin de semana) in the Argentine news cable channel Canal 26. Due to her commitments with her works as social media influencer and especially with her news programs, in July 2020 she refused, despite an initial availability, to participate in Cantando 2020, an Argentine talent show of singing that replaced Bailando 2020.

She took part, as principal actress, in the Argentine music video, published in September 2020, Mujer of Ecko. The Argentine press reported in April 2021 that she is one of the nominated for the Latin Plug Award, an International prize for the first time in Argentina, as "periodista del ano" (journalist of the year). She took part, as the main singer, dancer, showgirl and music composer, in the Argentine music video - produced in Colombia - Color, her second song published on 30 April 2021, in collaboration with Deer Models, obtaining success in Argentina and also in Chile. In May 2021 she participated as a guest star in the game show Pasapalabra, Especial Famosos, the Argentine version of The Alphabet Game. In the same period (May 2021), she definitively left all her roles in Canal 26, to focus on her career as a professional singer.

She has officially won the Latin Plug Award in May 2021 as Mejor Periodista Latin Plug del año (Best Journalist Latin Plug of the year). She participated as principal actress in the Argentine music video, published on 8 July 2021, De Ahí of Big Apple and Fer Palacio. She participated, as the main singer, dancer, showgirl and music composer, in the Argentine music video Todo está bien, her third song published on 20 August 2021, in collaboration with Deer Models. She enters the console and launches her career as a DJ in October 2021 according the Argentine press.

Works in the media

Television

Theater

Video clips

List of awards and nominations

References

External links

Romina Malaspina - photogallery

Argentine women journalists
Argentine female models
21st-century Argentine women singers
1994 births
Living people